The Battle of Sabugal was an engagement of the Peninsular War which took place on 3 April 1811 between Anglo-Portuguese forces under Arthur Wellesley (later the Duke of Wellington) and French troops under the command of Marshal André Masséna. It was the last of many skirmishes between Masséna's retreating French forces and those of the Anglo-Portuguese under Wellington, who were pursuing him after the failed 1810 French invasion of Portugal.

In poor weather, with heavy rain and fog, Allied forces succeeded in forcing the demoralized French force into retreat. The victory was lauded by the British; Sir Harry Smith, then a junior officer of the 95th Rifles and a participant in the battle, remarked "Oh, you Kings and usurpers should view these scenes and moderate ambition" while Wellesley later referred to the Light Division's action in the battle as "one of the most glorious that British troops were ever engaged in".

Background

By October 1810, Marshal Massena’s French army had been halted by the Lines of Torres Vedras, and the Peninsular War had reached a stalemate. Realising that a drive on to Lisbon before the onset of winter was unlikely, Masséna prepared to see out the winter months and renew the fight in the spring, despite scorched earth policies by the Allies rendering foraging for food very difficult. Having survived the winter, however, Massena order a general retreat on 3 March 1811, and the British forces under Wellesley followed. By the onset of April, the French forces were just inside Portugal, aligned along the Côa river. Jean-Baptiste Drouet, Comte d'Erlon's 9th Corps defended to the north, Louis Henri Loison's 6th Corps was in the centre and Jean Reynier's 2nd Corps held the south flank at Sabugal. Resting in the rear areas was Jean-Andoche Junot's 8th Corps. It was at Sabugal that Wellesley attempted to crush the French flank by attacking forces of the isolated 2nd Corps.

While the 1st, 3rd, 5th and 7th British-Portuguese divisions performed a frontal attack, the flanking Light Division miscalculated and attacked the French 2nd Corps in the flank rather than from the rear. With the leading British units cut off, and poor weather approaching, the British situation became increasingly difficult.

The battle

The 1st Brigade of the British-Portuguese Light Division crossed the Côa at 10.00 hrs on the morning of 3 April. The French 4th Légére (Light) from Pierre Hugues Victoire Merle's 1st Division was alerted by musket fire as the 1st Brigade drove off a small number of French pickets. The French formed a column and advanced on the British. While making good progress initially, the concentrated French force was driven back by British artillery. The 1st Brigade followed the retreating French forces up a nearby hill, but was quickly ousted by the remaining French forces, who still held a considerable numerical advantage. The British were forced back into cover behind some small stone walls. Heavy rain had also begun to interfere with the muskets of both sides. An attempted counter-attack by the 1st Brigade also ended in failure, as the French had in the meantime set up artillery. Together with further French reinforcements, Reynier forced the British back to the cover of the stone walls at the foot of the hill.

The crest was attacked for a third time by the 1st Brigade, now supported by the 2nd Brigade, which had arrived on the battlefield. While the French were initially pushed back, Reynier sent in a stream of French units to meet the arriving British 16th Light Dragoons and the surviving soldiers of the 1st and 2nd. With the rain clearing, Reynier could also see the British divisions beginning a frontal assault. This sight persuaded Reynier to pull back; however, the British were successful in seizing both his and General Pierre Soult's baggage carts, even if bad weather did prevent them from mounting a full pursuit.

A French commander, Baron Thiébault, blamed the collapse of the 2nd Corps for the French defeat on 3 April, stating that "It might have been avoided if General Reynier had had faith in Massena’s foresight". Sources differ in the number of French prisoners taken, ranging from 186 to over 1,500.

Erskine's role
Major-General William Erskine commanded the Light Division during the battle. Wellington planned to have the Light Division and two brigades of cavalry circle behind Reynier's open left flank while the other four divisions attacked in front. When the day dawned with heavy fog, the other commanders decided to wait until visibility improved. Undeterred, Erskine peremptorily ordered Lieut-Colonel Thomas Sydney Beckwith's 1st Brigade forward. Instead of crossing the Côa beyond Reynier's flank, the brigade drifted to the left in the fog, crossed at the wrong location and struck the French left flank.

Erskine, who was very nearsighted and mentally unbalanced, then became cautious and issued explicit instructions to Colonel George Drummond not to support his fellow brigade commander. At this point, Erskine rode off to join the cavalry, leaving the Light Division leaderless for the rest of the battle. Reynier switched most of his 10,000-man corps against Beckwith's 1,500 and pressed the light infantry back. When Drummond heard the sounds of battle approaching, he deduced that Beckwith's men were retreating. Disobeying orders, Drummond led his 2nd Brigade across the Côa and joined Beckwith. Together they drove the French back.

When the mist cleared, Reynier saw the other four divisions advancing in front, led by Thomas Picton's 3rd Division. He quickly withdrew the bulk of the II Corps, leaving 3,000 men of his right flank to hold off four divisions. William Grattan of the 88th Foot noted of the badly outnumbered French, "They never fought better. So rapidly did they fire that instead of returning their ramrods, they stuck them in the ground and continued to fight until overpowered by our men." Reynier admitted the loss of 760 men.

Aftermath
The guerilla war proceeded till the end of the Peninsular war.

The Spanish conventional warfare proceeded 
till the end of the Peninsular war.

Napoleon had ended his invasion of Spain with the occupation of Madrid.

The third Portuguese campaign ended with the French retreat out of Portugal.

The stalemate in the west started with the first siege of Badajoz.

Notes

References

Further reading

External links
 

Battles of the Peninsular War
Battles involving France
Battles involving Great Britain
Battles involving Portugal
Battle of Sabugal
Battle of Sabugal
April 1811 events
Arthur Wellesley, 1st Duke of Wellington